Ucklum is a locality situated in Stenungsund Municipality, Västra Götaland County, Sweden with 255 inhabitants in 2010.

In Ucklum there is a beach, Bastevik, which is used a lot in the summer.  It also has a local mountain called Ucklumberget.

Lättklinker Cement AB and Hercules have their workers in Ucklum.

It is the hometown of the Ucklum Daredevils, which were founded 1980–1981.

References 

Populated places in Västra Götaland County
Populated places in Stenungsund Municipality